Katherine Ng Kit Shuen (伍潔鏇), born in 1974, was the Political Assistant to the Secretary for Financial Services & the Treasury of Hong Kong.

Personal history
She was born in Singapore and moved to Hong Kong at the age of 3. She holds a Bachelor of Arts in Law from the University of Cambridge, a Postgraduate Diploma in Legal Practice from the College of Law in London, and a Master of Arts Degree in Law from the University of Cambridge. She qualified as a solicitor in the UK and Hong Kong in 1998 and 1999 respectively.

She worked for Merrill Lynch in Hong Kong from 2005 as the Director of its legal department. She has served at Linklaters' offices in London and Hong Kong, and was a Compliance Officer in Donald Tsang's election campaign for the Chief Executive of HKSAR.

Political assistant
She was appointed as a political assistant on 22 May 2008 by Donald Tsang. She is appointed under the expanded political appointment system on non-civil service terms for the term ending 30 June 2012.

As a political assistant, she receives HK$163,960 per month, 55% of a bureau director's salary.

Ng holds a Singaporean passport and not a Hong Kong SAR passport. She said she will not renounce it.

References

Living people
1974 births
Singaporean people of Chinese descent
Government officials of Hong Kong
Alumni of Trinity College, Cambridge